Nagapattinam Chandrashekharan Vasanthakokilam (1919 – 7 November 1951) was a Carnatic singer and actress. Her work included the performances of kritis by Tyagaraja and Muthuswami Dikshitar and in the years after Indian independence, she helped popularise the famous mystic poet of Tamil Nadu, Kavi Yogi Maharishi Dr. Shuddhananda Bharati's songs. She died of tuberculosis in 1951.

Early life

NCV was born as Kamakshi in Irinjalakkuda, Cochin State of British India, the present Kerala. Her family then shifted to Nagapattinam. Her father, Chandrashekhara Iyer sent her under the tutelage of Nagapattinam 'Jalra' Gopala Iyer, an accompanist in Harikatha performances. In 1936, the family moved to Madras, where she started giving concerts. She won the first prize in vocal music at the Madras Music Academy annual conference of 1938, which was presided over by Ariyakudi Ramanuja Iyengar and declared open by the Yuvaraja of Mysore.

Her Music

Her voice was melodious with perfect intonation, sruti, emotion, high-pitched and clear pronunciation of words. Her rendering of higher octaves and sruti were remarkably with effortless ease to bring off brigas. She sang plenty of Tamil songs. She was a regular performer at the festivals of the Tamil Isai Sangam in Madras and Nellai Sangeetha Sabha in Thirunelveli.

She also performed for the Tyagaraja Aradhana each year between 1942 and 1951. NCV ranked among the top performers of the classical singer of that time and many records were released containing her classical and semi-classical songs. The famous Carnatic music vocalist Tiger Varadachariar had bestowed upon her the title "Madhurageetha Vani".

Some of her famous songs are:

 yen paLLi koNdeer ayyaa
 thanthai thaai irundhaal umakkindha
 nitiraiyil vandhu nenjil idam
 mahalakshmi jaganmatha
 aanandha nadanam aadinAL
 aasai koNdEn vaNdE
 thithikkum senthamizhaal dEsaabhimaanam enum
 andha naaL ini varumO
 varuvaanO vanakkuyilE
 aadu raattE
 saarasa dala nayana
 indha varam tharuvaan
 needayarada

Film Songs

She also sang the following songs for the Tamil film industry, which became very popular. The Tamil film songs are :

 pozhudhu pularnthadhu yAm seidha thavathAl
 kuzhalOsai kEtkudhammA gOplakrishnan
 thanthai thaai irundhaal umakkindha
 nitthiraiyil vandhu nenjil idam

Acting career

Besides being a singer par excellence, NCV acted in movies. She started with Chandraguptha Chanakya (1940) playing the role of the princess Chaaya directed by C. K. Saachi in 1940. Followed by Venuganan (1940), Gangavathar (1942), Haridas (1944), Valmiki (1946), Kundalakesi (1946) and Krishna Vijayam (1950). Today, not many of her Carnatic renditions are available as CDs or audio recordings and those which are available contain both cinema and Carnatic compositions, mostly from various concerts she had given in the past.

Personal life

Her personal life was an unhappy one. Her marriage had been a failure as her husband was not inclined to encourage her music pursuits. In later years, she found a life-partner in a lawyer turned film-maker, C. K. Sathasivan (known as C. K. Saachi) till her last days.  She fell victim to a severe attack of tuberculosis, and died in 1951 at her residence in Gopalapuram, Madras. She was only thirty-two years old at the time of her death and the classical music world lost a singer with a dulcet voice.

References

 
 
 A SPRING IN MEMORY:THE VASANTHAKOKILAM CONNECTION Monday, 3 February 2014

External links
  - Song by NCV in the film Gangavathar

1919 births
1951 deaths
20th-century deaths from tuberculosis
20th-century Indian singers
20th-century Indian women singers
Carnatic singers
Women Carnatic singers
Film musicians from Kerala
Indian women playback singers
Malayalam playback singers
People from Irinjalakuda
Performers of Hindu music
Singers from Kerala
Tamil playback singers
Tamil singers
Tuberculosis deaths in India
Women musicians from Kerala